Erich Köhler (June 27, 1892 – October 23, 1958) was a German politician. He was the 1st President of the Bundestag from 7 September 1949 to 18 October 1950.

Köhler co-founded the Christian Democratic Union (Germany) in 1945. He was elected as a member of the first German Bundestag for Wiesbaden's constituency in 1949.

References

External links
 

1892 births
1958 deaths
Politicians from Erfurt
German People's Party politicians
Grand Crosses with Star and Sash of the Order of Merit of the Federal Republic of Germany
Presidents of the Bundestag
Members of the Bundestag for Hesse
Members of the Bundestag 1953–1957
Members of the Bundestag 1949–1953
Members of the Bundestag for the Christian Democratic Union of Germany